David Rizzio (– 9 March 1566) or Riccio was an Italian courtier, born in Pancalieri close to Turin, a descendant of an ancient and noble family still living in Piedmont, the Riccio Counts di San Paolo e Solbrito, who rose to become the private secretary of Mary, Queen of Scots. Mary's husband, Lord Darnley, is said to have been jealous of their friendship because of rumours that Rizzio had impregnated Mary, and he joined in a conspiracy of Protestant nobles to murder him, led by Patrick Ruthven, 3rd Lord Ruthven.  Mary was having dinner with Rizzio and a few ladies-in-waiting when Darnley joined them, accused his wife of adultery and then had a group murder Rizzio, who was hiding behind Mary. Mary was held at gunpoint and Rizzio was stabbed numerous times. His body took 57 dagger wounds.  The murder was the catalyst of the downfall of Darnley, and had serious consequences for Mary's subsequent reign.

Career
Rizzio (whose name appears in Italian records as Davide Riccio di Pancalieri in Piemonte) went first from Turin to the Court of the Duke of Savoy, then at Nice. However, finding no opportunities for advancement there, he found means in 1561 to get himself admitted into the train of the Count of Moretta, who was about to lead an embassy to Scotland. The Court in Scotland had no employment for Rizzio, and dismissed him. He ingratiated himself with the Queen's musicians, whom she had brought with her from France. James Melville, a friend of Rizzio, said that "Her Majesty had three valets in her chamber, who sung three parts, and wanted a bass to sing the fourth part". 

Rizzio was considered a good musician and excellent singer, which brought him to the attention of the cosmopolitan young queen. Towards the end of 1564, having grown wealthy under her patronage, he became the queen's secretary for relations with France, after the previous occupant of the post had retired. Rizzio was ambitious, controlling access to the queen and seeing himself as almost a Secretary of State. Other courtiers felt that as a Catholic and a foreigner he was too close to the queen. Rumours became rife that Mary was having an adulterous affair with Rizzio.

His salary for the post of valet was 150 Francs or £75 Scots. In 1565 he got £80 in four installments paid by George Wishart of Drymme. Mary gave him gifts of rich fabric from her wardrobe, including black velvet figured with gold, and five pieces of gold cloth figured with scales.

Murder 

Jealousy precipitated his murder in the Queen's presence, in her supper chamber in the Palace of Holyroodhouse on Saturday 9 March 1566 at 8 o'clock. The royal guards were overpowered and the palace was turned over to the control of the rebels.  Mary and Rizzio were in a supper room, which still exists as part of the bedchamber, and was then "a cabinet about XII foot square, in the same a little low reposinge bedde, and a table" according to an account of the murder written by Francis, Earl of Bedford, and Thomas Randolph. The room had been decorated by Mary's servant Servais de Condé.  

On the night of the murder Mary, Rizzio, and the Lady Argyll were seated at the supper table. The Queen was six months pregnant (with James VI) at the time, and some accused Rizzio of having impregnated her. The rebels burst into the cabinet or supper room, led by Lord Ruthven, and demanded that Rizzio be handed over. The Queen refused. Rizzio then hid behind Mary but was nevertheless seized. According to Mary, one of the intruders, Patrick Bellenden brother of the Lord Justice Clerk, pointed his gun at her pregnant belly, while Andrew Kerr of Faldonsyde threatened to stab her. Lord Ruthven denied this.

After this violent struggle, Rizzio was dragged through the bed-chamber into the adjacent Audience Chamber and stabbed an alleged 57 times. His body was thrown down the main staircase nearby (now disused) and stripped of his jewels and fine clothes. The location of Rizzio's murder is marked with a small plaque in the Audience Chamber, underneath which is a red mark on the floorboards, which reportedly was left when Rizzio was stabbed to death.

Rizzio was first buried in the cemetery of Holyrood Abbey. Buchanan states that shortly afterwards his body was removed by the Queen's orders and deposited in the tomb of the kings of Scotland in Holyrood Abbey. This strengthened the previous rumours of her familiarity with him. Rumours were thrown around about the motive for the murder – some claimed Darnley was jealous, or that powerful lords sought to manipulate Darnley and remove an irritating presence at court.

Aftermath
Immediately after the murder Mary was able to speak to Lord Darnley, and may have convinced him they were both in danger and captives in the palace. The guard around her was relaxed and at midnight the next day they escaped and she rode behind Arthur Erskine of Blackgrange, master of her stable, to Seton Palace and then to safety at Dunbar Castle. An English servant of Lord Darnley Anthony Standen later claimed to have accompanied the queen with John Stewart of Traquair and his brother William Stewart. Mary returned to Edinburgh with her supporters, and took up lodgings on the Royal Mile rather than return to the palace. On 21 March she had Darnley declared innocent of the murder.

Robert Melville arrived in Edinburgh from London and reported back to Elizabeth and Cecil on the aftermath of the murder. He noted that Morton, Lord Ruthven, Lord Lindsay, William Maitland of Lethington, the Clerk Register James Balfour, the Lord Justice Clerk John Bellenden (whose brother was alleged to have pointed a gun at the queen), and some gentlemen of Lothian, who were all suspected of having knowledge of the plan had fled.

Rizzio's brother, Joseph, arrived in Scotland with Michel de Castelnau and was appointed secretary in David's place by 25 April 1566. Joseph and an Italian colleague, Joseph Lutyni, had some trouble over coins taken from the queen's purse, and in April 1567 he was accused and acquitted with Bothwell of Darnley's murder.

Legacy and memorial
David Rizzio's career was remembered and referred to by Henry IV of France. Mocking the pretension of James VI of Scotland to be the "Scottish Solomon", he remarked that "he hoped he was not David the fiddler's son", alluding to the possibility that Rizzio, not Darnley, fathered King James.

It has been alleged that Rizzio is buried at Canongate Kirkyard, Edinburgh; this would have required reinterment of a Catholic with no living friends in a Protestant graveyard 120 years after his death. It is considered more likely that he lies in an unmarked grave in the graveyard attaching Holyrood Abbey. The Protestant historian George Buchanan wrote in 1581 that David was first buried outside the door of the Abbey, and then Mary arranged for him to be buried in the tomb of her father James V and Madeleine of France within. Buchanan described this circumstance as reflecting badly on the Queen. Fearing that Mary's son, James VI, would suppress the book, Buchanan's friend James Melville tried to get Buchanan to rewrite the passage while the book was at the printers. Buchanan asked his cousin, Thomas Buchanan, a schoolmaster in Stirling, if he thought the story was true, and the cousin agreed. The story was published.

Representation in fiction 
Rizzio was played by John Carradine in the 1936 RKO picture Mary of Scotland; by Ian Holm in the 1971 movie Mary, Queen of Scots; by Tadeusz Pasternak in the BBC mini-series Gunpowder, Treason, and Plot; by Andrew Shaver in The CW network television show Reign; and by Ismael Cruz Córdova in the 2018 film Mary Queen of Scots.

The murder of Rizzio and the subsequent downfall of Darnley form the main subject of the 1830 play Maria Stuart by Juliusz Słowacki.

Rizzio's life and death are a key plot element in Caleb Carr's Sherlock Holmes story The Italian Secretary, Holmes vocally dismissing the idea that Rizzio was ever anything more than entertainment.

Arthur Conan Doyle used the death of Rizzio as a plot point in his 1908 story, “The Silver Mirror”.

Rizzio's murder is also the subject of Scottish author Denise Mina's 2021 novella, "Rizzio".

The takers in hand
Thomas Randolph listed these men as participants in Rizzio's murder:
Earl of Morton
Patrick Ruthven, 3rd Lord Ruthven
Patrick Lindsay, 6th Lord Lindsay
William Maitland of Lethington
Master of Ruthven
John Cockburn, laird of Ormiston
William Sinclair of Herdmanston, laird of "Haughton"
John Crichton, laird of Brunstane
The laird of Whittinghame
The laird of Lochleven
The laird of Elphingstone (Johnston)
Patrick Murray
Andrew Kerr of Fawdonsyde, son-in-law of John Knox
William Tweedie of Drumelzier
Adam Tweedie of Dreva
with the preachers; John Knox and John Craig. On 19 March, the Privy Council sent letters to a number of men, requiring they attend in Edinburgh to answer questions.

References

Sources

The Register of the Privy Council of Scotland, edited by John Hill Burton, LL.D., vol.1. 1545–1569, Edinburgh, 1877, p. 437, lists all those charged with "the slauchter of David Riccio." Given the very many names shown, it presumably includes those in the wider conspiracy.

External links
 
 Manuscript of extracts of letters sent by Mary to her uncle, the Cardinal of Lorraine, with news of the murder from the Bibliothèque nationale de France

Scottish royal favourites
1530s births
1566 deaths
1566 in Scotland
Nobility from Turin
Italian expatriates in Scotland
Italian murder victims
Deaths by stabbing in Scotland
Burials at the Canongate Kirkyard
Burials at Holyrood Abbey
Italian people murdered abroad
Court of Mary, Queen of Scots
16th-century Italian nobility
Assassinated Italian politicians
People murdered in Scotland